Cedars Park is a historic public park located in Cheshunt, Hertfordshire, England. It was originally the site of Theobalds Palace, King James I's favourite residence. The park has received a Green Flag Award every year since 2009, rewarding it for promoting high standards of management for green spaces.

History

Cedars Park is the site of a 16th-century Royal Palace known as Theobalds, which existed as a smaller estate in the 14th century, and possibly earlier. The property was originally known as Cullynges, then Tongs, then Thebaudes, which adapted over time into the current name, Theobalds.

Sir William Cecil acquired Theobalds in 1563, and Queen Elizabeth I visited in 1564. Although Cecil had initially purchased the property for use as a quiet family home, he heavily expanded it in preparation for the Queen's next visit - she visited several times before William Cecil's death in 1598. Robert Cecil inherited the Palace and accommodated King James I and his associates on several occasions - James I also brought his brother-in-law Christian IV of Denmark on at least two occasions. Munten Jennings was Cecil's gardener at the estate. In May 1607, Cecil and James I exchanged Theobalds and Hatfield House - officially, Theobalds was put in Queen Anne's name. Munten Jennings further extended the estate - this included building a 2500-acre deer hunting park with a 10-mile-long brick surround, and a silkworm house. As a Royal Palace, it was the venue of state occasions, from a masque by Ben Jonson to the raising of the Royal Standard by Charles I at the start of the Civil War. James I died here in 1625. Charles I rarely used Theobalds Palace and granted the estate to various nobles as an acknowledgement of their services until it was sold to the Prescott family in the late 1700s, when it underwent great changes.

During the Civil War, Major-General William Packer ordered the demolition of several buildings at Theobalds, so that the material from their lead roofs may be sold to fund the War. Between 1765 and 1770, George Prescott built four houses at Theobalds, possibly making use of materials from buildings that had been demolished. The houses were named Old Palace House, The Cedars, Jackson House, and Grove House - collectively Theobalds Square. Jackson House was turned into a school in the 19th century, and demolished in the early 1900s, along with Grove House. Old Palace House was destroyed in a fire in the late 1960s. What remains of The Cedars is a three-story brick building, which is currently used as a tea room and private home. The remains of some walls and foundations can be found throughout the park today.

In 1820, Theobalds was rented to Sir Henry Meux, who stayed at The Cedars. Admiral of the Fleet Sir Hedworth Meux inherited The Cedars from Valerie, Lady Meux on condition that he change his surname from Lambton to Meux. The grounds were donated to the public in 1919 and on 2 July 1921, Hedworth Meux and the Earl of Cavan officially opened the area as a public park.

Cedars Park contains several scheduled monuments, as the site of a magnificent and influential Tudor house (now demolished) with extensive grounds, created by the leading architects, gardeners and craftsmen for Sir William Cecil, and becoming an occasional place for Elizabeth I to reside. Elements of the present park can be identified as probable parts of the original Elizabethan, Jacobean and Georgian gardens and outbuildings.

Management
Cedars Park is managed by Broxbourne Borough Council.

In 2011, the Council received a £1.89 million grant from the Heritage Lottery Fund and Big Lottery Fund to protect and improve Cedars Park, and conserve & promote its heritage. As a result, several new features have been added, facilities have been upgraded, and community involvement has increased.

To celebrate the Golden Jubilee of Elizabeth II, the park was given protection as a Queen Elizabeth II field under Fields in Trust.

Access 
There are pedestrian and vehicle entrances on Theobalds Lane (near Theobalds Grove railway station) with additional pedestrian access by Winston Churchill Way. There is a free car park on site.

Cedars Park and its Nature Centre are fully wheelchair accessible.

References

Cheshunt
Parks and open spaces in Hertfordshire